Neuropsychology Review is a peer-reviewed medical journal published by Springer Science+Business Media covering all aspects of neuropsychology.

External links 
 

Review journals
Springer Science+Business Media academic journals
Neuropsychology journals
Publications established in 1990
Quarterly journals